Akhmed Osmanovich Chakaev (born 23 March 1988 in Khasavyurt, Dagestan) is a Russian freestyle wrestler of Chechen ethnicity. World freestyle wrestling bronze medalist (2 time). He is a silver medalist in the Golden Grand Prix Ivan Yarygin 2009 in the Freestyle men's 60 kg event. He won the Ali Aliyev Memorial, winner of Russian nationals in 2009 and 2012 and the bronze medal in 2014. In Golden Grand Prix Ivan Yarygin 2015 in round one 65 kg, he defeated American prospect Cadet World champion and Silver Junior World Championships Aaron Pico.

Akhmed has a younger brother Anzar. They train in Tiger Muay Thai gym (Phuket) with George Hickman, Tai Tuivasa, Mairbek Taisumov, Mark Hunt, Tyson Pedro, Nordine Taleb and others.

Championships and accomplishments
Ali Aliyev Memorial Gold Medalist – 60 kg, 65 kg (2009, 2012, 2014, 2015)
A multiple Golden Grand Prix Ivan Yarygin Medalist.
Ramzan Kadyrov Cup Winner (2010, 2011, 2013. 2015)
2012 Ivan Yarygin Bronze Medalist - 60kg. 
2014 Ivan Yarygin Bronze Medalist - 65kg. 
2014 Russian Nationals – 3rd place (2014, Yakutsk)
2015 World Freestyle Wrestling Cup 2015 – 4th place (Los Angeles, USA)
2015 Russian Nationals – 3rd place (2015, Kaspiysk)
2015 European Nations Cup 2015 (Moscow Lights-Alrosa Cup) – 61 kg
2016 Non-Olympic weight World Championships bronze medalist – 61 kg
2016 Ivan Yarygin Bronze Medalist - 61kg. 
2017 Ivan Yarygin Winner - 61kg. 
2017 European runner-up – 61 kg
2017 Alany international winner – 65 kg;
2018 Ivan Yarygin Silver Medalist - 65kg.
2018 Russian nationals 1st – 65 kg
2018 World Championships bronze medalist – 65 kg.
2019 Ivan Yarygin winner – 65 kg.
European Games 2019 bronze medalist – 65 kg.

References

External links
 

1988 births
Living people
Russian male sport wrestlers
Chechen sportsmen
People from Khasavyurt
World Wrestling Championships medalists
European Games bronze medalists for Russia
Wrestlers at the 2019 European Games
European Games medalists in wrestling
European Wrestling Championships medalists
Sportspeople from Dagestan
20th-century Russian people
21st-century Russian people